Dalat is a state constituency in Sarawak, Malaysia, that has been represented in the Sarawak State Legislative Assembly since 1991.

The state constituency was created in the 1987 redistribution and is mandated to return a single member to the Sarawak State Legislative Assembly under the first past the post voting system.

History
2006–2016: The constituency contains the polling districts of Penat, Tanam, Dalat, Kut, Baoh, Sebakong, Oya, Terus, Teh Oya, Senau, Balan, Ud, Baru Dalat, Sungai Dalam, Klid, Kekan, Medong, Kut Muara, Ulu Baoh, Narub, Dijih, Ulu Sikat, Nanga Sikat, Engkerbai.

2016–present: The constituency contains the polling districts of Tanam, Dalat, Kut, Balan, Ud, Baru Dalat, Sungai Dalam, Klid, Kekan, Medong, Kut Muara, Narub, Oya, Terus, Teh Oya, Senau.

Representation history

Election results

References

Sarawak state constituencies